Tangjiazhuang is a subdistrict in the city of Tangshan, Hebei, China. The population (2005) is 79,100.

Township-level divisions of Hebei